Uranium ruthenium silicide (URu2Si2) is a heavy fermion alloy composed of uranium, ruthenium, and silicon. URu2Si2 has the same '122' tetragonal crystal structure as many other compounds of present condensed matter research. URu2Si2 is a superconductor with a hastatic order (HO) phase below a temperature of 17.5 K. Below this temperature, it is magnetic, and below about 1.5 K it superconducts. However, the nature of the ordered phase below 17.5K is still under debate despite a wide variety of scenarios that have been proposed to explain this phase.

References

Correlated electrons
Superconductivity
Silicides
Uranium compounds
Ruthenium compounds